Jincheon National Training Center is a sports village under the Korean Sport & Olympic Committee. It was built due to the lack of space at the Korea National Training Center. After completing the first phase of the project on October 27, 2011, the completion ceremony was held on September 27, 2017, and it is located at 105 (Hoejuk-ri 374-1) of the athletes' village in Gwanghyewon-myeon, Jincheon-gun, Chungcheongbuk-do.  

The total area is 856,253 square meters, and 350 athletes in 12 sports, including track and field, shooting and swimming, will be able to train at the latest facilities.

See also
Korea National Training Center

References

Sport in Korea
2017 establishments in South Korea
Jincheon County